This article lists political parties in the Northern Mariana Islands. 
The Northern Marianas has a multi-party system, with two or three strong parties and a third party that is electorally successful. Only four parties have been officially recognized: The Democratic Party, The Republican Party, The Reform Party, and The Covenant Party. As of 21 December, 2021, The Democratic Party and the Republican Party are the only two parties represented in elected and appointed offices, alongside a number of independents. The Reform Party and the Covenant Party, are inactive and de facto dissolved.

The Covenant Party was a political party advocating governmental and financial reform. It was named after the Covenant to Establish a Commonwealth of the Northern Mariana Islands in Political Union with the United States of America, Act of Mar. 24, 1976, Pub. L. 94-241, 90 Stat. 263, codified as amended at 48 U.S.C. § 1801 note. The Covenant Party is considered de facto dissolved when Governor Eloy Inos departed the party and rejoined the GOP in 2013. Many left the party soon after, most moving to the Republic Party, making it a de facto GOP absorption of the Covenant Party. On August 19, 2021, during an interview on the 2022 gubernatorial election, Lt. Gov. Arnold I. Palacios mentioned that the GOP did vote to approve the merger in 2013. They have no elected positions and have not put forward a candidate since their last attempt in the 2012 midterm elections.

The Reform Party was a political party that was not an affiliate of the Reform Party USA but rather the American Reform Party, a splinter group of that party. The party was founded in 1999 by former Governor Froilan C. Tenorio, who claimed to be disgruntled and tired of the disunity showed by his former political affiliation, the Democrats. The party is considered a dead party, abandoned after their 2003 defeat. Party founder Froilan Tenorio switched back to the Democratic Party for his 2005 Gubernatorial bid, signaling to all that the Reform Party was effectively dead. Their website no longer exists, only accessible through the Wayback Machine, which shows the last moment it was accessible is 2008 and that the last newsletter posted was by former Reform Senator Ramon "Kumoi" Guerrero on 10 December 2001.

The parties
Covenant Party
Democratic Party 
Reform Party
Republican Party
Source: PUBLIC LAW NO. 12-18

See also
 Politics of the Northern Mariana Islands
 List of political parties by country
Political party strength in the Northern Mariana Islands

References

Northern Marianas
 
Political parties
Northern Mariana Islands
Political parties